Ambition is the first novel by Julie Burchill published in 1989 hardback and 1990 paperback, .

It tells the story of the ambitious if unimaginatively named Susan Street and her efforts to become a newspaper editor. To achieve her goal she is set a number of tasks by a press magnate. These involve her flying around the world to have sex with a large number of men and women while he looks on. It was selected by Sarra Manning for a list of the ten best "dirty books" published in Red Magazine.

References

External links
 Goodreads page

Novels by Julie Burchill